The Petrov Affair is a 1987 mini series based on the defection of Vladimir Petrov.

References

External links

Australian television films
1987 television films
1987 films